Mangaonoho railway station was a station on the North Island Main Trunk in New Zealand. For almost a decade, from 1893 to 1902, Mangaonoho was important as the northern terminus of the NIMT's southern section; even a refreshment room was planned. The route north was delayed by construction of major viaducts, the first being Makōhine. To build Makōhine a railway workshop was set up just north of Mangaonoho. Unlike many other NIMT construction camps, Mangaonoho gradually declined after the line was completed. By 1911 the population was down to 167. Decline continued, with removal of the stockyards in 1973 and closure in 1982. There is now only a single line through the former station site.

The New Zealand Ministry for Culture and Heritage gives a translation of "the stream of Noho" for Mangaonoho.

History 
A platelayer's cottage and siding were built in 1892, and a sawmill was moved to the station in 1893.

The  extension from Kaikarangi (or Rangatira as it then was) was contracted to Cleghorn, Forest, and Magee of Auckland, in 1890, for £26,499 and vested in the Railway Commissioners on 14 April 1893, regular services ran from Monday 1 May 1893 and a daily train ran from 4 December 1893. However, the contract for building the station was only let in March 1893, work was in progress on building the 4th class station by June that year and it continued into 1895. The stationmaster's house was completed in 1895, as was a windmill for water-supply. A crane was added in 1897. A post office opened at the station on 6 June 1894. There was a tablet and fixed signals. A crossing loop could take 99 wagons.

Mangaonoho became an accounting station on 27 April 1894 after a telegraph line was built from Hunterville. It then had 3 staff and sold 5,752 tickets in the year to 31 March 1895. 

 Mangaonoho, depart daily, 6.40 a.m., Hunterville, 7.15 a.m., and Marton arrive 8 30 a.m.
 Mangaonoho, depart Tuesday, Wednesday, Friday, 12.40 p.m., Hunterville 1.15 p.m., and Marton arrive 2 30 p.m.
 Mangaonoho, depart Thursday and Saturday, 4.50 p.m., Hunterville, 5.25 p.m., and Marton arrive 6.40 p.m. 
 Marton, depart daily, 9.35 a.m , Hunterville 11 a m., and Mangaonoho arrive 11.30 am.
 Marton depart Tuesday, Wednesday, and Friday 3.15 p.m., Hunterville 4.40 p.m., and Mangaonoho arrive 5.10 pm.
 Marton depart Thursday and Saturday 7.25 p m., Hunterville 8.30 p.m, and Mangaonoho arrive 9,30 p.m. 

The journey was shortened to about 90 minutes when the new Marton station opened at the junction in 1898.

Mangaonoho didn't feature in revenue statements after 1904, when the staff was down to 1, though 6,662 tickets had been sold in 1903, but only  of timber were railed out.

Decline started when the line opened to Mangaweka on 16 August 1902. Mangaonoho became a flag station and lost its stationmaster from 3 November 1902. The Post Office was removed on 16 January 1903, though reopened in 1908 and finally closed on 25 February 1963. In 1911 one cottage was moved to Te Wera and another to Whangamōmoana – requesting authority £131.10.0.Approval to remove the station building was given in 1971. On 19 September 1986 the station closed to all traffic.

Workshop 
Mangaonoho Public Works Department workshop opened in 1896,  to the north of the station, on what was Waterfall Rd (now Ironworks Rd), where a passing loop for 67 wagons remains. The works was fully operational from late 1898. Electricity lit the track and workshop to allow 16-hour working days. All the steelwork for the Makōhine Viaduct was ready in 1900. Up to 300 were employed in building the viaduct. Two of them died in accidents.

In 1901 the workshop was also preparing steelwork for the Mangaweka Viaduct. It later prepared the steel for Taonui and Hapuawhenua viaducts, opened in 1908.

Makōhine Tunnel 
The lining of the tunnel was completed in August, except about 15ft kept open to enable the men to run the cutting to spoil. The walls were thick concrete, with an arch of concrete blocks. It was constructed by co-operative labour, who suffered no accidents. However, a mother and four children died when a spoil heap from the tunnel cutting collapsed on them. The tunnel was daylighted in 1984, prior to electrification.

Makōhine Viaduct 
Very close to the former tunnel, Makōhine is the southernmost of the five largest NIMT viaducts.  It spans the Makōhine Stream, which flows into the Rangitīkei River just over a kilometre downstream. Like the river, the stream is incised into the soft late Pliocene to early Pleistocene sediments, which are part of the Whanganui Basin.

Although the rails had reached the gorge in 1894, it wasn't until February 1896 that tenders were called. They exceeded expectations, which were £30,000 to £50,000, so PWD also used worker co-operatives for this contract. Further delays were caused by a steel strike in Britain (1,272 tonnes of steel were used) and heavy rain on the unstable soil, which affected pier foundations in 1897 and flooded the gravel pit in 1898. It wasn't until 1900 that pier construction began. The spans are longer than other NIMT viaducts to minimise the piers needed. The viaduct was opened by the Minister of Public Works, William Hall-Jones, on 17 June 1902.

The viaduct was strengthened around 1932 to allow for the heavier K class, by adding intermediate vertical struts to the Warren trusses of the two main spans. The viaduct was again strengthened in the early 1980s to prepare for electrification, by replacing the smaller end spans, replacing wooden beams supporting the track with steel, and adding links to transmit traction and braking forces into the main structure.

Mangaonoho deviation 
As the 1979 map above shows, the line to the south of Mangaonoho largely curved around the contours. No.19 tunnel was daylighted in 1972, on the section of line later bypassed. A $1,403,897 1984 contract by John McLachlan Ltd. covered the deviation, which straightened the line and bypassed No.8 tunnel with a large cutting at a lower level, built by Ian A. Martin Ltd at a cost of $853,461.

References

External links 

 Video of Mangaonoho deviation under construction

Photos -

 Workshop - 1902 girders in workshop yard, blacksmiths, houses, tree stumps and workshop
 Makōhine Viaduct  and Tunnel under construction -
 Tunnel and horse tramway
 Viaduct pier
 1902 opening train
 1935 mixed train hauled by a WAB 4-6-4T
 2016 viaduct

Defunct railway stations in New Zealand
Rail transport in Manawatū-Whanganui
Buildings and structures in Manawatū-Whanganui
Railway stations opened in 1893
Railway stations closed in 1982
Rangitikei District
Railway bridges in New Zealand
Heritage New Zealand Category 1 historic places in Manawatū-Whanganui